Lakena United is a Tuvalu football club from Nanumea, playing in the Tuvalu A-Division.

The team's home ground is the Tuvalu Sports Ground, the only football field in Tuvalu. Lakena United plays on an amateur level, as do all the teams in Tuvalu. They also have a reserve squad and a women's team.

History
Lakena United is formed in 1980.
Lakena United won in the Independence Cup five times in 2000, 2001, 2002, 2004 and 2007. And in 2004, and 2006, they won the Tuvalu A-Division. In 2011, they won the first time the Christmas Cup.

Current squad
As of 5 July 2012.

Lakena United B

Honours

League
Tuvalu A-Division
Winners (2): 2004, 2006

Cup

Independence Cup
Winners (5): 2000, 2001, 2002, 2004, 2007
Runners-up (2): 2005, 2010
Tuvalu Games
Runners-up (1): 2008
Christmas Cup: (1)
Winners (1): 2011
Runners-up (1): 2010

See also
 Lakena United Women

External links
 vriendenvantuvalu.nl
 tnfa.tv

Football clubs in Tuvalu
Nanumea
1980 establishments in Tuvalu
Association football clubs established in 1980